Cheeral  is a village in Wayanad district in the state of Kerala, India.

Demographics
 India census, Cheeral had a population of 15620 with 7728 males and 7892 females.

Transportation
Cheeral village can be accessed from Sultan Bathery, Nambiarkunnu and Ayyankolly (Tamilnadu) with bus services.

The nearest railway station is at Mysore and the nearest airports are Mysore Airport (MYQ - Domestic only -104km), Kozhikode International Airport-120 km, Bengaluru International Airport-290 km, and   Kannur International Airport, 114 km.

Education 
There is an Aided Upper Primary School which has the Grades from 1st standard to 7th standard and Government High school from grades 8th to 10th. The Government high school which was earlier known as Govt.Model High School was renamed into Government Model Higher secondary School with the allocation of Plus 1 and Plus 2 courses beginning of the academic year 2000.

References

Villages in Wayanad district
Sultan Bathery area